Egyptian faience is a sintered-quartz ceramic material from Ancient Egypt. The sintering process "covered [the material] with a true vitreous coating" as the quartz underwent vitrification, creating a bright lustre of various colours "usually in a transparent blue or green isotropic glass".

It is not faience in the usual sense of tin-glazed pottery, and is different from the enormous range of clay-based Ancient Egyptian pottery, from which utilitarian vessels were made. It is similar to later Islamic stonepaste (or "fritware") from the Middle East, although that generally includes more clay.

Egyptian faience is considerably more porous than glass proper. It can be cast in molds to create small vessels, jewelry and decorative objects. Although it contains the major constituents of glass (silica, lime) and no clay until late periods, Egyptian faience is frequently discussed in surveys of ancient pottery, as in stylistic and art-historical terms, objects made of it are closer to pottery styles than ancient Egyptian glass. 

Egyptian faience was very widely used for small objects, from beads to small statues, and is found in both elite and popular contexts. It was the most common material for scarabs and other forms of amulet and ushabti figures, and it was used in most forms of ancient Egyptian jewellery, as the glaze made it smooth against the skin. Larger applications included cups and bowls, and wall tiles, mostly used for temples.

Scope of the term

It is called "Egyptian faience" to distinguish it from faience, the tin-glazed pottery whose name came from Faenza in northern Italy, a center of maiolica (one type of faience) production in the late Middle Ages.  Egyptian faience was both exported widely in the ancient world and made locally in many places, and is found in Mesopotamia, around the Mediterranean and in northern Europe as far away as Scotland. The term is used for the material wherever it was made and modern scientific analyses are often the only way of establishing the provenance of simple objects such as the very common beads.

The term is therefore unsatisfactory in several respects, although clear in an Ancient Egyptian context, and is increasingly rejected in museum and archaeological usage. The British Museum now calls this material "glazed composition", with the following note in their online collection database: The term is used for objects with a body made of finely powdered quartz grains fused together with small amounts of alkali and/or lime through partial heating. The bodies are usually colourless but natural impurities give them a brown or greyish tint. Colourants can also be added to give it an artificial colour. It can be modelled by hand, thrown or moulded, and hardens with firing. This material is used in the context of Islamic ceramics where it is described as stonepaste (or fritware). Glazed composition is related to glass, but glass is formed by completely fusing the ingredients in a liquid melted at high temperature. This material is also popularly called faience in the contexts of Ancient Egypt and Ancient Near East. However, this is a misnomer as these objects have no relationship to the glazed pottery vessels made in Faenza, from which the faience term derives. Other authors use the terms sintered quartz, glazed frit, frit, composition, Egyptian Blue, paste or (in the 19th century) even porcelain, although the last two terms are very inappropriate as they also describe imitation gems and a type of ceramic. Frit is technically a flux.

Glazes

From the inception of faience in the archaeological record of Ancient Egypt, the elected colors of the glazes varied within an array of blue-green hues. Glazed in these colours, faience was perceived as substitute for blue-green materials such as turquoise, found in the Sinai Peninsula, and lapis lazuli from Afghanistan. According to the archaeologist David Frederick Grose, the quest to imitate precious stones "explains why most all early glasses are opaque and brilliantly colored" and that the deepest blue color imitating lapis lazuli was likely the most sought-after. As early as the Predynastic graves at Naqada, Badar, el-Amrah, Matmar, Harageh, Avadiyedh and El-Gerzeh, glazed steatite and faience beads are found associated with these semi-precious stones. The association of faience with turquoise and lapis lazuli becomes even more conspicuous in Quennou's funerary papyrus, giving his title as the director of overseer of faience-making, using the word which strictly means lapis lazuli, which by the New Kingdom had also come to refer to the 'substitute', faience. The symbolism embedded in blue glazing could recall both the Nile, the waters of heaven and the home of the gods, whereas green could possibly evoke images of regeneration, rebirth and vegetation.

Relationship with Egyptian copper industry

The discovery of faience glazing has tentatively been associated with the copper industry: bronze scale and corrosion products of leaded copper objects are found in the manufacture of faience pigments. However, although the likelihood of glazed quartz pebbles developing accidentally in traces in copper smelting furnaces from the copper and wood ash is high, the regions in which these processes originate do not coincide.

Relationship with Egyptian glass industry
Although it appears that no glass was intentionally produced in Egypt before the Eighteenth Dynasty (as the establishment of glass manufacture is generally attributed to the reign of Thutmose III), it is likely that faience, frit and glass were all made in close proximity or in the same workshop complex, since developments in one industry are reflected in others. Such close relationship is reflected in the prominent similarity of the formulations of faience glaze and contemporary glass compositions. Despite the differences in the pyrotechnology of glass and faience, faience being worked cold, archaeological evidence suggests that New Kingdom glass and faience production was undertaken in the same workshops.

Production

Typical composition and access to raw materials
Faience has been defined as the first high technology ceramic, to emphasize its status as an artificial medium, rendering it effectively a precious stone. Egyptian faience is a non-clay based ceramic composed of crushed quartz or sand, with small amounts of calcite lime and a mixture of alkalis, displaying surface vitrification due to the soda lime silica glaze often containing copper pigments to create a bright blue-green luster. While in most instances domestic ores seem to have provided the bulk of the mineral pigments, evidence suggests that during periods of prosperity, raw materials not available locally, such as lead and copper, were imported. Plant ash, from "halophyte" (salt-tolerant) plants typical of dry and sea areas, was the major source of alkali until the Ptolemaic Period, when natron-based alkalis almost completely replaced the previous source. Although the chemical composition of faience materials varies over time and according to the status of the workshop, also as a cause of change of accessibility of raw materials, the material constitution of the glaze is at all times consistent with the generally accepted version of faience glazing.

Faience working technology
Typical faience mixture is thixotropic, that is thick at first and then soft and flowing as it begins to be formed.
This property, together with the angularity of silica particles, accounts for the gritty slumps formed when the material is wetted, rendering faience a difficult material to hold a shape. If pressed too vigorously, this material will resist flow until it yields and cracks, due to its limited plastic deformation and low yield strength.

Body binding technology
A number of possible binding agents, amongst Arabic gum, clay, lime, egg white and resin, have been suggested to help in the binding process. Although traces of clay have been found in most Pharaonic faience, reconstruction experiments showed that clay, organic gums or lime while successfully improving the wet working performance, failed to improve the fired strength of the faience, or proved the gum was too sticky for the removal of objects from their molds. The use of alkalis as binders, in the form of natron or plant ash, produced suitable results in experiments. Pulverized glass or sintered material of similar composition could also enhance the fired strength of faience bodies: the compositions of such glasses is in fact comparable to the published compositions of New Kingdom glass.

Body working technology
Three methods have been hypothesized to shape the body of faience objects: modeling, moulding and abrasion, the last being used in conjunction with the first two. Modeling, scraping and grinding are the techniques most widely used in earlier times, as represented in the material qualities of Predynastic and Protodynastic faience objects. Predynastic bead manufacture is essentially a cold technology, more akin to stone working than glass: a general form of faience is modeled, possibly free formed by hand, then holes are drilled to create beads.

In the Middle Kingdom, the techniques employed are molding and forming on a core, sometimes in conjunction with intermediate layers between the glaze and the body. Marbleized faience, resulting from the working of different colored faience bodies together, so as to produce a uniform adherent body, also appears in this period. Towards the end of the Middle Kingdom, incising, inlaying and resisting techniques appear: these were bound to become progressively popular towards the New Kingdom. In the New Kingdom, beads, amulets and finger rings are produced by a combination of modeling and molding techniques. In this period, sculptural detail is created using inlays of different colored faience or by scraping the body to reveal the white intermediate layer in relief. Moulding was first applied to faience manufacture in the Middle Kingdom by forming a model of an object, or employing a finished faience piece, impressing it in wet clay, and later by firing the clay to create a durable mold. The faience paste could then be pressed into the mold, and following drying, be re-worked through surface abrasion before firing. Moulds could facilitate mass production of faience objects such as amulets rings and inlays, as evidenced by the several thousand of small open face, earth-ware clay molds excavated at Tell el Amarna. The level of standardisation that use of moulds produced varied, with a compositional and morphological study of faience ushabtis suggested that mass-production is an oversimplification of a complex process that may more accurately described as batch-processing.

Wheel throwing, possibly occurring from the New Kingdom onwards, is certainly established by the Greco-Roman period, when large amounts of clay seem to have been added to the faience body. Because of the limited plasticity of faience, rendering throwing extremely difficult, a progressive increase of clay in the faience bodies culminating in the quartz, clay and glass frit bodies of Islamic times, is observed in the archaeological record.

Ptolemaic and Roman faience tends to be typologically and technologically distinct from the earlier material: it is characterized by the widespread use of moulding and high relief on vessels. A very unusual and finely made group of figures of deities and falcons in the Metropolitan Museum of Art in New York, apparently representing hieroglyphs that are elements from a royal inscription, perhaps from a wooden shrine, is decorated in a form of champlevé (typically a technique for enamel on metal).  Depressions in the faience body were filled with coloured "vitreous pastes" and refired, followed by polishing.

Polychrome pieces were usually made by inlaying different colours of paste.

Glazing technology
The technology of glazing a siliceous body with a soda lime silica glaze employs various methods discovered over time: namely application, efflorescence and cementation glazing.

Application glazing
In the application method, formerly assumed to be the only one used for faience glazing; silica, lime and alkalis are ground in the raw state to a small particle size, thus mixed in water to form a slurry which is then applied to the quartz core. Partial fritting of the slurry favors the first stages of vitrification, which in turn lowers the final firing temperature. The slurry can be then applied to the body, through brushing or dipping, to create a fine, powdery coating. Upon firing, the water from the melting glaze partially diffuses in the sand body, sintering the quartz particles and thus creating some solid bridges in the body.

Efflorescence glazing
In the self-glazing process of efflorescence, the glazing materials, in the form of water-soluble alkali salts, are mixed with the raw crushed quartz of the core of the object. As the water in the body evaporates, the salts migrate to the surface of the object to recrystallize, creating a thin surface, which glazes upon firing.

Cementation glazing

Cementation glazing, a technique discovered in the Middle Kingdom, is also a self-glazing technique. The possibility of the existence of cementation glazing, also known as 'Qom technique', followed the observation of this method being used in the city of Qom in Iran in the 1960s. In this method the artifact, while buried in a glazing powder with a high flux content, is heated inside a vessel, causing the fusion of the object with the cement. During firing, the flux migrates to the quartz and combines with it to form a glassy coating.

Alternative techniques
A vapour glaze reaction similar to salt glazing, as an alternative glazing process, has been suggested. In this process, the vaporization or dissociation of salts leads to vapour transport through the enveloping powder to the quartz body where a glaze is formed.

Recognition of glazing techniques
Although glaze compositions vary regionally and chronologically, depending on the formation of the body and the glazing process employed, objects produced with different glazing techniques do not exhibit immediate diagnostic chemical variations in their compositions. The recognition of the various glazing techniques, through microscopic observations of the degree of sintering and the vitreous phase of quartz body, is also ambiguous. For instance, objects with applied glazes and those which may have been glazed by efflorescence have overlapping characteristic features. The following proposed criteria are subject to variation caused by increases in flux concentration, firing temperatures and time at peak temperatures.

Recognition of application glazing- Macroscopically, applied glazes vary in thickness through the body, displaying thicker glazes on bases. The traces of kiln supports, as well as the characteristic tendency to run and drip leading to pooling, may indicate the orientation of the object during firing. In high magnification observations, the interface boundary of body and glaze appears well defined. The absence of interstitial glass in the core is characteristic of application glazing: however, the possibility of adding glazing mixture to the quartz sand body, as well as the use of pre-melted glazes in the later periods, can predictably increase the degree of sintering of the core

Recognition of cementation- Objects glazed through cementation display a thin even glaze all over the body, with no drying or firing marks, and portray a fairly friable and soft body Microscopically, the concentration of copper characteristically decreases from the surface: the interaction layer is thin and well defined and the interstitial glass is absent with exception to the vicinity of the boundary layer.

Recognition of efflorescence glazing- Pieces glazed by efflorescence may show traces of stand marks: the glaze appears thick and prone to cracking, thinning toward the edge of the piece and in concave areas. In high magnification the interstitial glass is extensive; the unreacted salts which have not reached the surface fuse of the body accumulate in the core, creating bridges between the quartz particles.

Typologies

An extensive literature has accumulated in attempt to explain the processing of Egyptian faience and develop an adequate typology that encompasses both technological choices and chemical variations of faience bodies. Body color, density and luster provided the basis of the first typology developed for faience: seven variants were proposed by Lucas and Harris and still permit the archaeologist to distinguish faience objects during field sorting.

Classification of body variants
Most of the seven variants introduced by Lucas fail to recognize the glazing technology utilized or to suggest the stylistic and technological choices embedded in the manufacture of a faience object. However, variant A describes a technologically unique product and as such is still applicable: it has a finely ground underglaze consisting of quartz particles in a glass matrix, often revealed by incisions or depressions cut into the overlying glaze. Glassy faience, variant E, displays no distinct outer layer from the interior, thus it has been suggested that the term 'faience' is a misnomer and the alternative name 'imperfect glass' has been advised. Regarding variant F specimens, Lucas suggests the use of lead glazes, however it appears that lead glazing was never practiced in Ancient Egypt.

Workshop evidence

The excavations led by Petrie at Tell-Amarna and Naucratis have reported finding workshop evidence.
Nicholson explains, however, that while a square furnace-like structure at Amarna may be related to faience production, Petrie did not encounter any actual faience kilns at the site. Lucas documented a large number of molds at the palace area of Amenhotep III at Qantir, from 19th to 20th Dynasties, and at the palace area of Naucratis, also described in different sources as a scarab maker's and faience factory. However, seeing there is a lack of carefully documented archaeological evidence as to the nature of faience factory sites, direct information about the glazing process does not exist.

Although recent excavations at the archaeological sites of Abydos and Amarna have supplemented our knowledge of the ancient production of faience gained from the earlier excavated sites of Lisht, Memphis and Naukratis, the differentiation of glass furnaces from faience kilns still remains problematic. Replication experiments, using modern kilns and replica faience pastes, indicate that faience is fired in the range of 800–1000°C

Current use
A number of ceramists are experimenting with Egyptian faience, though some of the compositions bear only a passing resemblance to the original Egyptian formulae. There has also been a recent interest in the use of Egyptian faience in 3-d printing technology. It may be possible to fire faience-like materials in a microwave.

Gallery

Notes

Further reading

 Binns. 1932. An experiment in Egyptian blue glaze. Journal of the American Ceramic Society.
"BM": "glazed composition", British Museum term note
 Boyce, A. 1989. Notes on the manufacture and use of faience rings at Amarna. In: Kemp, B.J. Amarna Reports V. London: Egypt Exploration Society. 160–168.
 Brill, R.H. 1999. Chemical Analyses of Early Glasses: Volume 1 (tables) and Volume 2 (catalogue), Corning, NY: Corning Museum of Glass,
 Clark, Robin JH, and Peter J. Gibbs. 1997. "Non‐Destructive In Situ Study of Ancient Egyptian Faience by Raman Microscopy." ‘’Journal of Raman Spectroscopy ‘’ 28 (2–3): 99–103.
 Dayton, J.E. Minerals, Metals, Glazing and Man. Edinburgh: Harrap Publishers. 1978.
 Friedman, F.D. (ed.). 1998. Gifts of the Nile-ancient Egyptian faience. London: Thames and Hudson.
 Henderson, Julian, Robert Morkot, E. J. Peltenburg, Stephen Quirke, Margaret Serpico, John Tait, and Raymond White. 2000. ‘’Ancient Egyptian Materials and Technology.’’ Cambridge University Press.
 Lucas, A. and Harris, J. R., 1962, Ancient Egyptian materials and industries. London: Edward Arnold.
 Kaczmarczyk, A. and Hedges. R.E.M. 1983. Ancient Egyptian Faience. Warminster: Aris and Phillips.
 Kiefer, C. and Allibert, A. 2007. Pharanoic Blue Ceramics: the Process of Self-glazing. Archaeology 24, 107-117.
 Kiefer, C. 1968. Les céramiques blues, pharanoiques et leur procédé révolutionnaire d'emaillage. Industrie Céramique. May 395-402.
 Kühne, K. 1974 "Frühgeschichtliche Werkstoffe auf Silikatischer Basis", Das Altertum 20, 67-80
 Nicholson, P.T.1993. Egyptian faience and glass. Aylesbury: Shire- Egyptology.
 Nicholson, P.T. and Peltenburg, E. 2000. Egyptian faience. In: Nicholson, P.T. and Shaw, I. Ancient Egyptian Materials and Technology. Cambridge: Cambridge University Press, 177–194.
 Noble, J. V. 1969. The technique of Egyptian faience. American Journal of Archaeology 73, 435–439.
 Rehren, Th. 2008. "A review of factors affecting the composition of early Egyptian glasses and faience: alkali and alkali earth oxides." ‘’Journal of Archaeological Science’’ 35 (5): 1345–54.
 Shortland, A.J. and Tite M.S. 2005. A technological study of Ptolemaic – early roman faience from Memphis, Egypt Archaeometry 47/1, 31–46.
 Stone, J. F. S. and Thomas, L. C. 1956. The Use and Distribution of Faience in the Ancient East and Prehistoric Europe, Proceedings of the Prehistoric Society, London 22, 37–84.
 Stocks, D.A.1997. Derivation of ancient Egyptian faience core and glaze materials. Antiquity 71/271, 179–182.
 Petrie, W. M. F.1909. Memphis I, London: British School of Archeology in Egypt.
 Tite, M.S. and Bimson, M. 1986. Faience: an investigation of the microstructures associated with the different methods of glazing, Archaeometry 28, 69–78.
 Tite, M.S., Freestone I.C. and Bimson. M. 1983. Egyptian faience: an investigation of the methods of production, Archaeometry 25, 17–27.
 Vandiver P.B. 1983. Egyptian faience technology, Appendix A. In: A. Kaczmarczyk and R.E.M. Hedges, Editors, Ancient Egyptian Faience, Warminster: Aris and Phillips, A1–A144.
 Vandiver, P. and Kingery, W.D. 1987. Egyptian Faience: the first high-tech ceramic. In Kingery, W.D. ed., Ceramics and Civilisation 3, Columbus OH: American Ceramic Society, 19–34.
 Verges, F.B. 1992. Bleus Egyptiennes. Paris: Louvain
 Wulff, H. E., Wulff, H. S. and Koch, L., 1968. Egyptian faience - a possible survival in Iran. Archeology 21, 98–107. www.qomtechnique.com
 Williamson, R.S.1942. The Saqqara Graph. Nature 150, 607-607.
 Whitford, Michelle F.; Wyatt-Spratt, Simon; Gore, Damian B.; Johnsson, Mattias T.; Power, Ronika K.; Rampe, Michael; Richards, Candace; Withford, Michael J. (2020-10-01). "Assessing the standardisation of Egyptian shabti manufacture via morphology and elemental analyses". Journal of Archaeological Science: Reports. 33: 102541. doi:10.1016/j.jasrep.2020.102541. ISSN 2352-409X. S2CID 224873688.

See also 
William the Faience Hippopotamus

Pottery
African pottery
Glass compositions
History of glass
Ceramic glazes
Types of pottery decoration
Ancient Egyptian pottery
Egyptian inventions